Uri Ben-Ari  (Hebrew: אורי בן-ארי) may refer to:

Uri Ben-Ari) (1925-2009), brigadier general of the Israeli Defence Forces, diplomat and writer
 (born 1964), Israeli former basketballer and businessman
 (born 1990),  Israeli songwriter , composer and singer